Martry is an electoral district, civil parish and townland in County Meath, Ireland.

References 

County Meath